Giannis Anastasiou (born 5 March 1973) is a Greek professional football manager and former player, who is the current manager of Super League club Panetolikos.

As a player, Anastasiou played as a striker, and was active professionally in Greece, Belgium and the Netherlands. He also represented the Greece national team at senior international level.

Playing career
Born in Arta, Anastasiou played professionally in Greece, Belgium and the Netherlands for PAS Preveza, Ethnikos Piraeus, OFI Crete, Anderlecht, Roda JC, Ajax, Sparta Rotterdam and Omniworld.

He also earned five caps for the Greece national team between 1998 and 1999.

Managerial career
After his retirement from football in 2008, Anastasiou joined Panathinaikos as an assistant to manager Henk ten Cate. In 2011, he left Greece for the Netherlands as assistant coach for Jong Ajax, the reserve team of Ajax. After two years, Anastasiou joined English club Reading in January 2013 as a first team coach; he had first met their manager Brian McDermott in June 2012 while completing his UEFA Pro License. His stay at Reading lasted just two months, and he left the club following the departure of McDermott on 11 March 2013.

Panathinaikos
Anastasiou was named manager of Panathinaikos in May 2013. In his first year, the team won the Greek Football Cup with a 4–1 victory against PAOK in the final. During that year, he also led the team in a 3–0 victory against Olympiacos, a record away victory in the derby. In the Superleague Greece, the team finished fourth in the regular season and first in the play-offs, qualifying for next year's UEFA Champions League third qualifying round. In February 2015, he was named Manager of the Year for 2014.

In the 2014–15 season, Panathinaikos, was eliminated in the Champions League third qualifying round by Standard Liège with an aggregate score of 1–2. The team succeeded in entering the UEFA Europa League group stage, finishing last in Group E, against Dynamo Moscow, PSV and Estoril. In the domestic league, Panathinaikos finished second behind Olympiacos in the league and first in the play-offs. On 24 May 2015, Anastasiou managed his 100th game at the side of Panathinaikos, against Atromitos.

In the beginning of the 2015–16 season, the team failed to qualify in the Europa League group stage, getting eliminated by Gabala in the play-offs. On 2 November 2015, Panathinaikos announced the termination of his contract on terms of mutual consent.

Roda
On 18 June 2016, Anastasiou signed a one-year contract as manager of Dutch Eredivisie side Roda JC, for whom he was also active as a player from 2000 until 2004.

On 24 April 2017, Belgian side KV Kortrijk announced the signing of Anastasiou as their head coach, moving from Roda to Kortrijk at the end of the 2016-17 season.

Anastasiou led Roda to a 17th-place finish in the Eredivisie, which meant that Roda had to play promotion/relegation play-offs. However, on 23 May 2017, midway through the play-offs, Anastasiou was sacked as manager of Roda.

Kortrijk
At Kortijk, Anastasiou was sacked on 8 November 2017 with the team in penultimate position in the league, just one point above last place.

Omonia
He became manager of Omonia in November 2018.

Atromitos
On 23 May 2019, Anastasiou has become the new head coach of Atromitos, penning a one-year deal with the Peristeri club. On 16 November 2019, Atromitos announced the termination of Anastasiou's contract as coach.

Panetolikos
In July 2021 he signed a contract with Panetolikos.

Honours

Player
Anderlecht
Belgian First Division A: 1999–2000
Belgian Super Cup: 2000

Ajax
 Eredivisie: 2003–04

Manager
Panathinaikos
 Greek Cup: 2013–14

Individual
 Greek Super League Manager of the Year: 2013–14

References

1973 births
Living people
Footballers from Arta, Greece
Greek footballers
Greece international footballers
Greek football managers
Preveza F.C. players
Ethnikos Piraeus F.C. players
OFI Crete F.C. players
R.S.C. Anderlecht players
Roda JC Kerkrade players
AFC Ajax players
Sparta Rotterdam players
Almere City FC players
Super League Greece players
Belgian Pro League players
Eredivisie players
Eerste Divisie players
Reading F.C. non-playing staff
Greek expatriate footballers
Greek expatriate sportspeople in Belgium
Expatriate footballers in Belgium
Greek expatriate sportspeople in the Netherlands
Expatriate footballers in the Netherlands
Greek expatriate sportspeople in England
K.V. Kortrijk managers
AC Omonia managers
Greek expatriate football managers
Association football forwards
Atromitos F.C. managers
Panetolikos F.C. managers